Kolti is a village in Bajura District in the Seti Zone of north-western Nepal. At the time of the 1991 Nepal census it had a population of 4,530 and had 850 houses in the village.

In 1999 Mr. Pradip Kumar Giri was elected as Chairman of Kolti Village Development Committee. During his tenure Kolti village development picked up Rapidly. To name some of the good works which he did during his tenure are - Fitting up proper drinking water system, irrigation canal to paddy fields, modern day farming and research on cash crop that has made Kolti as Himalayan Olive Belt now. By widening of walking trails Kolti has been marked in the Great Himalayan Trail route, Mr. Robin Boustead who has been findings trails in the Himalayas has trekked in Kolti area and that too with Mr. Giri. His contribution in education sector and culture is huge, he upgraded Jana Prakash secondary school to higher secondary school, setting up primary school in Kolti airport bazar area through public funding, he allocated the budget allocation for festivals to make them vibrant. He took retirement from active politics in 2015. 

Kolti Village Development Committee name has been changed to Budhinandha Municipality as per the new Federal Republic of Nepal constitution. Mr. Padam Kumar Giri of Nepali Congress Party was elected as Mayor of Budhinandha Municipality in 2018.

References

Populated places in Bajura District